Scott Thomas (born July 19, 1966) is a Republican politician and attorney who serves as the District Attorney for North Carolina Prosecutorial District 4. He previously served in both the North Carolina House of Representatives and North Carolina Senate.

Early life and career
In addition to his work in the General Assembly, Thomas was a partner in the New Bern law firm Chesnutt, Clemmons, Thomas, and Peacock. He quit this post upon appointment as District Attorney. His wife, Sherri, is an elementary school principal and they are the parents of three daughters.

Thomas is an alumnus of East Carolina University in Greenville, NC where he earned a B.S. in Political Science and was SGA President.

He graduated with a J.D from North Carolina Central University School of Law in 1992.

North Carolina General Assembly
Thomas was elected to the North Carolina House of Representatives in 1998. He was then elected to the North Carolina Senate representing the 2nd senatorial district. On January 18, 2006, Thomas resigned as State Senator to become District Attorney. He was appointed to the vacant post on January 24 by Governor Mike Easley to replace W. David McFadyen Jr., who retired early. Thomas was sworn in on January 30. He has been elected District Attorney four times and is serving his fourth term. C.W. "Pete" Bland, the Sheriff of Craven County, North Carolina, was appointed to replace Thomas in the State Senate. Bland was defeated for election to a full term by Republican State Representative Jean Preston.

District Attorney
Thomas is the North Carolina Prosecutorial District 4, which includes Carteret, Craven and Pamlico counties. He is  a past President of the North Carolina Conference of District Attorneys and former Chairman of the Governor's Crime Commission.

References

External links

|-

|-

|-

East Carolina University alumni
1966 births
District attorneys in North Carolina
Living people
Members of the North Carolina House of Representatives
North Carolina state senators
Politicians from New Bern, North Carolina
21st-century American politicians